Joost Adema (born 28 September 1959) is a retired Dutch rower who specialized in the coxless pair. In this event, together with Sjoerd Hoekstra, he won a bronze medal at the 1982 World Rowing Championships and finished in seventh place at the 1984 Summer Olympics.

References 

1959 births
Living people
Dutch male rowers
Sportspeople from Leiden
Olympic rowers of the Netherlands
Rowers at the 1984 Summer Olympics
World Rowing Championships medalists for the Netherlands